Voges is a surname. Notable people with the surname include:

Adam Voges (born 1979), Australian cricketer and coach
Carol Voges (1925–2001), Dutch illustrator and cartoonist
Danie Voges (born 1954), South African professional wrestler
Gerrit Voges (1932–2007), Dutch footballer
Mathias Voges (born 1943), Dutch politician and historian
Mitch Voges (born 1949), American amateur golfer
Torsten Voges (born 1961), German actor
Wally Voges (born 1936), South African water polo player